Michael W. King is an American filmmaker, producer, director, and writer of music videos, documentaries, and films. King is the founder of Michael King Productions, LLC. and lives in Scottsdale,_Arizona with his son, Mathias. He is a former board member of the International Documentary Association (IDA) and a member of the Directors Guild of America (DGA).

Life 

King attended and graduated high school at New London High School (New London, Connecticut), and went on to college at Connecticut College, graduating with a BA in Government in 1975. King also later received an MA in Film Studies from the University of Amsterdam (The Netherlands), and a postgraduate degree in Feature Film Directing from the Amsterdam School of the Arts, Maurits Binger Film Institute.

Michael W. King also taught screenwriting and film from 2000-01 at the European Center of  Emerson College in the Netherlands, and was the Filmmaker-in-Residence and Professor of Film at Lynn University in Boca Raton, Florida (2007–08).

Career 
In 1991, Michael W. King produced an MTV music video based on Dr. Martin Luther King’s speech "I Have A Dream". In 1995, King produced, directed, and wrote a PBS documentary titled Making A Living, the African-American Experience, which featured American actor Joe Morton. In 1997, he directed and wrote his first feature film in the Czech Republic, entitled Vanity Kills. In 1999, King created an Emmy award-winning PBS documentary entitled Bangin’, featuring Chuck D from Public Enemy, which explored youth violence in America.

In 2007, he completed a feature documentary called Rapping with Shakespeare (2008), which followed the story of an English teacher who used hip hop and rap to help his students better access Shakespeare's works, while making parallels between the lives of five South Central Los Angeles teenagers and Shakespeare's characters.

Michael King also executive produced Crenshaw Nights, starring Vondie Curtis-Hall and Judd Nelson in 2008 for the American Film Institute.

In 2010 King produced, directed, and wrote a documentary called The Rescuers, which tells the story of 13 heroic World War II diplomats who helped save the lives of tens of thousands of Jews during the Holocaust. The Rescuers stars historian and Holocaust expert Sir Martin Gilbert and Rwandan anti-genocide activist Stephanie Nyombayire, and features Prince Charles, Prince of Wales.

Filmography

Awards and nominations

References

Sources
 Dorsey, Kristina (10/16/2010) "NHLS grad uses new film as history lesson"(The Day) (New London,Connecticut): p. 1 Events.
 "Connecticut College: Awards" https://web.archive.org/web/20100527141541/http://www.conncoll.edu/alumni/2570.htm. Retrieved 10/25/2010.
 "Directors Guild of America Official Website" https://web.archive.org/web/20090331234007/http://www.dga.org/index2.php3?chg=. Retrieved 10/28/2010.

External links 
 Rapping with Shakespeare the official movie site
 
 "Sir Martin Gilbert Official Webpage" http://www.martingilbert.com/. Retrieved 10/28/2010.
 Interview with Michael W. King about The Rescuers for The Day newspaper
 Michael King Productions LLC official website

1952 births
Living people
Connecticut College alumni
University of Amsterdam alumni
Emerson College faculty
Lynn University alumni
People from La Quinta, California
People from New London, Connecticut